Munsonville is an unincorporated community in the town of Nelson in Cheshire County, New Hampshire. It is located in the northwestern corner of Nelson, around the outlet of Granite Lake.

New Hampshire Route 9, a major east-west highway in the state connecting Concord and Keene, bypasses Munsonville to the south. (The highway ran through the center of the village until the 1990s.)

"Munsonville", "Stoddard" and "Nelson" are all valid place names used for the 03457 ZIP code.

Notable people
Joe Dobson, Major League Baseball pitcher who lived in Munsonville after his playing career was over
Ralph Page, contra dance caller and authority on American folk dance
Paul Swingle, former Major League Baseball pitcher with the California Angels

References

Unincorporated communities in Cheshire County, New Hampshire
Unincorporated communities in New Hampshire
Nelson, New Hampshire